Behzad Behzadpour (born 1961- Tehran) is an Iranian director, screenwriter, editor and film actor.

Filmography

Director 

 Khodahafez Rafiq (Episode 1) (2003)
 Khodahafez Rafiq (Episode 2) (2003)
 Khodahafez Rafiq (Episode 3) (2003)

the writer 

 Non-Profit Police Station (2008)
 Khodahafez Rafiq (Episode 1) (2003)
 Khodahafez Rafiq (Episode 2) (2003)
 Khodahafez Rafiq (Episode 3) (2003)
 Ranger (1999)
 Secret Club (1998)
 Peak of the World (1995)
 Last Identification (1995)

References

External link 

 
 

Living people
Iranian writers
Iranian screenwriters
Iranian film directors
1961 births